George E. Ericson (September 8, 1902 –; September 30, 1980) was an American farmer and politician. He served in the Minnesota House of Representatives from 1951 to 1954.

Early life and career 
Ericson was borm in Argyle, Marshall County, Minnesota and graduated from Baudette High School in Baudette, Minnesota. He went to the United States Coast Guard Academy and the University of Minnesota. Erison lived in Pequot Lakes, Cass County, Minnesota with his wife and family and was a sheep and dairy farmer.

Elected office 
Ericson served one term in the Minnesota House of Representatives, from 1951 to 1954. 

He ran again for the Minnesota House of Representatives in 1956. The election results were contested and no candidate was seated. Ericson did not prevail in a special election to fill the vacant seat in 1957.

Personal life 
In 1969, Ericson moved to Saint Paul, Minnesota with his wife and family. Ericson died in Saint Paul, Minnesota and was buried in Rosemount, Minnesota.

References

1902 births
1980 deaths
People from Cass County, Minnesota
People from Marshall County, Minnesota
Farmers from Minnesota
University of Minnesota alumni
United States Coast Guard Academy alumni
Members of the Minnesota House of Representatives